Austin Stone Worship, formerly Austin Stone, are an American contemporary worship music collective from Austin, Texas founded in part by Chris Tomlin. The band started making music in 2002, while they have since released six albums, and four of those charted on the Billboard magazine charts.

Background
Formed in 2002 in Austin, Texas, with Chris Tomlin, being one of their originating members, and they now count as their members the following: Aaron Ivey, Chris Collins, Kyle Lent, Matthew Moore, Philip Ellis, Logan Walter, Jimmy McNeal, Daniel Darnell, Marcus Dawes, Brett Land, Jimmie Ingram, Todd Hartmann, Jeremy Andrew, Matt Graham, Jaleesa McCreary, Dietrich Schmidt, James Muturi, Zach Conley, and Christian Rudman.

Music history
The worship collective have released six albums, and four of those charted on the Billboard magazine charts. Their albums are the following: Austin Stone Live in 2011, A Day of Glory in 2012, The Reveille Volume 1 in 2013, King of Love in 2013, The Reveille Volume II in 2014, and This Glorious Grace'' in 2015.

Members
Current members
 Aaron Ivey
 Chris Collins
 Kyle Lent
 Matthew Moore
 Philip Ellis
 Justin Cofield
 Jimmy McNeal
 Daniel Darnell
 Jarryd Foreman
 Marcus Dawes
 Brett Land
 Matt Graham
 Jaleesa McCreary
 Laney Sprague
 Dietrich Schmidt
 James Muturi
 Matthew Moore
 Ryan Robertson
 Will Sorley
 Betsabe Del Pilar
Former members
 Chris Tomlin

Discography

References

External links
 

Musical groups from Austin, Texas
2002 establishments in Texas
Musical groups established in 2002